Phyllis Stanley (30 October 1914 – 12 March 1992) was a British actress.

Personal life 
During World War II, she shared a flat in West End of London with the Scottish heiress Jane Corby.

Partial filmography

 Leave It to Blanche (1934) - Singer
 Too Many Millions (1934) - Tamara
 Hello, Sweetheart (1935)
 Side Street Angel (1937) - Laura
 Command Performance (1937) - Olga
 Sidewalks of London (1938) - Della
 There Ain't No Justice (1939) - Elsie Mutch
 Jeannie (1941) - Mrs. Whitelaw
 The Next of Kin (1942) - Miss Clare, the dancer
 We'll Smile Again (1942) - Gina Cavendish
 They Met in the Dark (1943) - Lily Bernard
 One Exciting Night (1944) - Lucille
 Good-Time Girl (1948) - Ida (uncredited)
 Look Before You Love (1948) - Bettina Colby
 That Dangerous Age (1949) - Jane
 The Law and the Lady (1951) - Lady Sybil Minden
 Thunder on the Hill (1951) - Nurse Phillips
 Lovely to Look At (1952) - Prospective Investor Wife (uncredited)
 Rogue's March (1953) - Mabel (uncredited)
 Take Me to Town (1953) - Mrs. Edna Stoffer
 Her Twelve Men (1954) - Mrs. Curtis (uncredited)
 Strange Lady in Town (1955) - Mrs. Clegg (uncredited)
 The Black Sleep (1956) - Daphne
 The Seventh Sin (1957) - Dorothy Duvelle (uncredited)

References

External links

1914 births
1992 deaths
Actresses from London
British film actresses
20th-century British actresses
20th-century English women
20th-century English people